The Parc des Combes is a park located in Le Creusot, in Burgundy, France. The wooded park forms a tourist attraction, served by a tourist train, called Train des combes. The French word Combe can be translated as anticlinal valley, given that the park is located on an old Morvan valley. On the top of the hill, near the tourist train station, there is a roller coaster and karting.

External links
 Parc des Combes - official site

Geography of Saône-et-Loire
Amusement parks in France
Buildings and structures in Saône-et-Loire
Tourist attractions in Saône-et-Loire